ICE 4 is a brand name for long-distance Intercity-Express high-speed trains being procured for Deutsche Bahn.

Procurement started around 2008 for replacements for locomotive-hauled InterCity and EuroCity train services, and was later expanded to include replacements for ICE 1 and ICE 2 high-speed trainsets. In 2011 Siemens Mobility was awarded the contract for 130 seven-car intercity train replacements, and 90 ten-car ICE train replacements, plus further options – the contract for the ten-car sets was modified in 2013 to expand the trainset length to twelve vehicles. The name ICx was used for the trains during the initial stages of the procurement; in late 2015 the trains were rebranded 'ICE 4', at the unveiling of the first train set, and given the class designation 412 by Deutsche Bahn.

Two pre-production trainsets had been manufactured by 2016, and were used for testing later that year, prior to the introduction of the main series in late 2017.

History

Contract and manufacture
Around 2008 Deutsche Bahn began the tendering process to replace locomotive/coach trainsets on its long distance subsidiary, DB Fernverkehr's, InterCity and EuroCity train services. The initial announcement suggested that the tender would be for 100 to 130 trainsets. No specific train type was specified and DB did not intend to become involved with the design process - both locomotive-hauled trains such as Railjet or variations on the ICE 3 EMU design was considered to be options. The new trains were to be branded ICX and were expected to be similar in aesthetic design to the ICE3 trains; the design speed was expected to be in the  range and to improve upon the energy efficiency of the units it replaced.

Bids were received from Alstom and Siemens, with the Siemens bid including Bombardier Transportation as a subcontractor. Initial bids made in 2009 were said to be too high by DB, being over €5 billion. In 2010, DB announced that Siemens had been chosen as the preferred bidder for the procurement scheme, and on 9 May 2011 DB and Siemens signed a contract for 130 ICx trains, plus a further 90 trainsets to be formalised at a later date, with an option for a further 80 sets. The trains were to be delivered by 2030, with the value of the 220 train deal estimated at around €6 billion. Siemens' share of the contract for the intercity sets was later reported as being worth €3.7 billion to the company, reported to be the "biggest order in the company's history".

In 2011 Siemens awarded Bombardier Transportation a subcontract for its contribution to the project valued at €2.2 billion, of which €1.3 billion was for the 130 'intercity' trains. Bombardier's contract included aerodynamic optimisation of the design, and supply of the bodyshells - initially expected to come from its Görlitz plant, with driving vehicle assembly to take place at its Hennigsdorf plant, and Flexx Eco bogies manufactured at its plant in Siegen. The change in the initial order from 10 to 12 car ICE replacement trains (170 additional vehicles) resulted in a €336 million increase in the value of Bombardier's order.

Bodyshells are also to be supplied from Bombardier's Wroclaw plant (Poland). In 2015 Bombardier contracted Panattoni Europe to build an additional  manufacturing hall for the Wroclaw plant, initially to be used for the construction of the ICx trains.

Faiveley was awarded (late 2011/early 2012) contracts to supply brake equipment, including magnetic track brakes, and electropneumatic brake systems; as well as doors and air conditioning systems for the 130 unit intercity order.

Voith was contracted to supply parts of the nose of the trainsets, including GFRP cabin, the nose module and its opening hatches, coupling systems, and snow deflector.

Construction of the trainsets was expected to start in 2013, with two pre-production trains delivered by 2016.

With Alstom taking over Bombardier’s rail business in January 2021, Bombardier’s manufacturing responsibility of remaining sets on order were transferred to Alstom.

Design
The initial contract with Siemens, signed 2011 specified a design allowing flexible train make-up (between 5 and 14 units), with 24 different variants described; each composed of motor cars, and trailer cars.

Each trainset was to have a restaurant/bistro car, cycle storage, and a designated 'family area'.

The exterior design received a Red Dot design award in 2015.

The K3 trains are to be for Germany, Austria and Switzerland, 12 of the K1 trains are to be operated into the Netherlands.

On 5 March 2013, DB announced that it had approved a 12 car  train configuration that would raise capacity over, and replace in the base order, the existing 10 car train - seating capacity would increase from 724 seats to 830 seats. The order was altered in expectation of growing ridership for DB's long-distance services. In 2020, DB announced a further order of a 13-car configuration, with increased passenger capacity and a higher top speed.

Introduction, operations, and maintenance

By 2013 DB had selected a site in Nippes, Cologne for a maintenance depot for all of its ICE fleet including future ICx trains.

In April 2015 DB Systemtechnik began climatic testing on the ICx cab and other components. Mainline test runs by DB Systemtechnik began on 25 September 2015.

One pre-series-production trainset was formally unveiled at Berlin Südkreuz on 4 December 2015. The trainsets were re-branded ICE 4 at the same time (see also Intercity-Express), and given the network classification Class 412.

On 16 September 2016, Siemens announced that the ICE 4 had been approved for operation by Federal Railway Authority (EBA). Trial passenger operations commenced on Hamburg - Würzburg - Munich services on 31 October 2016 with full service expected from December 2017.

On 26 September 2018, the DB board approved the purchase of 18 additional seven-car trainsets and 50 individual cars to be added to trainsets then on order.

On 4 April 2019 it was announced that due to problems with the carriage frames of the ICE 4 trains, Deutsche Bahn would not take delivery of any further trains. Manufacturers Siemens and Bombardier Transportation were asked by DB to fix the issues.

On 17 July 2019 it was announced that Siemens, Bombardier, and Deutsche Bahn had come to an agreement in which Siemens and Bombardier would fix the trains, which were deemed safe, between 2020 and mid-2023. Also Deutsche Bahn would begin immediately accepting more deliveries of the trains.

In 2020, it was announced that up to 50 13-car configurations would be put into service from 2021, known publicly as "XXL-ICE" trains. These longer trains will be 374 meters long, and carry up to 918 passengers.

Formation

7-car sets
The 7-car sets, K1s (former classification K1n), are formed as follows.

12-car sets
The 12-car sets, K3s, are formed as follows.

13-car sets
The 13-car sets, K4s, are formed as follows.

Interior

See also
Intercity Express Programme, contemporary procurement programme for UK high speed and intercity trains
Siemens Velaro, high speed train
List of high-speed trains

References

Sources

External links

 

Railway coaches of Germany
Electric multiple units of Germany
Passenger trains running at least at 200 km/h in commercial operations
Passenger trains running at least at 250 km/h in commercial operations
15 kV AC multiple units
Siemens Velaro
Siemens multiple units
Bombardier Transportation multiple units